Proseilemmene was a Roman town in ancient Anatolia; possibly of ancient Phrygia or of Galatia. Its site is not located specifically but is west of Lake Tuz in Asiatic Turkey.

References

Populated places in ancient Galatia
Former populated places in Turkey
Populated places in Phrygia
Lost ancient cities and towns
Roman towns and cities in Turkey